The VinFast VF 6 is an electric subcompact crossover SUV that will be produced and marketed by VinFast from 2023. On January 6, 2022, the model was presented for the first time at the Consumer Electronics Show, and was shown in full at the 2022 Paris Motor Show.

Overview
The model has infotainment technology that allows users to stream videos, play games, shop online or control their smart home devices as part of the Smart Service subscription package.

References

External links
 

Cars introduced in 2022
Crossover sport utility vehicles
Production electric cars
VF 6
Battery electric vehicles
Front-wheel-drive vehicles